Alireza Rezaei (born 11 December 1999) is an Iranian footballer who plays for Esteghlal in the Persian Gulf Pro League.

Club career

Paykan
He made his debut for Paykan in first fixture of 2020–21 Persian Gulf Pro League against Sanat Naft.

Esteghlal
He made his debut for Esteghlal against Nassaji. He was the goalkeeper for three consecutive matches and only conceded 1 goal against Sanat Naft. He was the goalkeeper for 2 Hazfi cup matches, in which he conceded 1 goal only.

Honours

Esteghlal 
Iran Pro League: 2021–22
Iranian Super Cup:  2022

References

External links
 

1999 births
Living people
Iranian footballers
Paykan F.C. players
Esteghlal F.C. players
Association football goalkeepers
People from Qazvin